Picota is a town in Northern Peru, capital of the province Picota in the region San Martín. There were 7,941 inhabitants, according to the 2007 census.

References

Populated places in the San Martín Region